Rafael Velasco (November 3, 1947 – September 12, 2004) was a Mexican film/television actor. He participated in the Cinema of Mexico from 1980 to 2004.

Biography
Velasco was born Rafael Tobías Velasco Romero in Mexico City, Distrito Federal, Mexico. Rafael started making movies in 1979, in which he made his first appearance in the Mexican movie "Malas influencias, Las", he then made his 5th appearance in the American movie "Solo" which was made in 1996.

Velasco married Margarita Villaseñor Sanabria on November 3, 1991 (on Velasco's birthday), they were married until Velasco's death in 2004.

Rafael VeIasco died on September 12, 2004, in Mexico City, Mexico, he was 56 years old at the time of his death. He had died from myocardial infarction.

Filmography
Zapata - El sueño del héroe (2004) - Don Lázaro
Virgen de Guadalupe, La (2002) (mini TV series) - Rafael Bernardino
El Gavilán de la Sierra (2001) - Aurelio
Rito terminal (2000) - 
Sueño del caimán, El (2000) - Caimán
El evangelio de las maravillas (1998) - Mateo 
Último profeta, El (1998) -
Solo (1996) - Justos
Revancha, La (1995) - Negro 
Pícara soñadora, La (1991) (TV series) - 
Crimen imposible (1990) -
Extraño retorno de Diana Salazar, El (1988) -
Malas influencias, Las (1980) -

External links
 

Mexican male film actors
Mexican male television actors
Male actors from Mexico City
Mexican people of Italian descent
1947 births
2004 deaths
20th-century Mexican male actors
21st-century Mexican male actors